The 1911 Ole Miss Rebels football team represented the University of Mississippi during the 1911 college football season. Before the week of the Egg Bowl rivalry, a new set of stands had been added on the east side of The Fairgrounds in Jackson.  As the teams prepared for kickoff the new stands collapsed injuring at least 60 people, some seriously.  Despite the disaster, the game proceeded without interruption and resulted in a 6 to 0 A&M win. The Commercial Appeal complimented the play of Ole Miss halfback Pete Shields. By Walton and Rube Barker were All-Southern.

Schedule

Players

Line

Backfield

References

Ole Miss
Ole Miss Rebels football seasons
Ole Miss Rebels football